Europium iodide may refer to:

 Europium(II) iodide (europium diiodide), EuI2
 Europium(III) iodide (europium triiodide), EuI3